Vibeke Falk (née Mowinckel; 27 September 1918 – 9 October 2011) was a Norwegian actress.

Biography
She was a daughter of wholesaler Thorolf Beyer Mowinckel and Jenny Modesta Fasmer, 
From 1937 to 1950, she was married to actor Lauritz Falk (1909–1990).

Falk made her stage debut at Søilen Teater in 1938, and film debut in  Gjest Baardsen  in 1939. 
During the period 1939-42, she was employed at the Nationaltheatret in Oslo  and at Trøndelag Teater in Trondheim in 1952-53 and again in 1958-60. In the period 1960-68 she was at the Den Nationale Scene in Bergen  and after that freelance. She was featured in the role of Anna Reinche in the Norwegian film classic Gjest Baardsen from 1939 directed by Tancred Ibsen.
In the 1940s she participated in the Swedish films Nygifta (1941), The Old Clock at Ronneberga (1944),Between Brothers (1946) and Singoalla (1949).

References

1918 births
2011 deaths
Actors from Bergen
Norwegian stage actresses
Norwegian film actresses